Brenda Lee Banks (July 19, 1948 – December 30, 2020) was an American animator, who was one of the first African American women to work as a professional animator.

History

Early life and education
Banks was born in Los Angeles on July 19, 1948. She graduated from Fremont High School in 1967 and then went on to attend the California Institute of the Arts. She continued her education up through 1977 even while being involved in concurrent animation work projects.

Career
The earliest known works that Banks was involved in include those starring Clerow Wilson in the early 1970s and the 1973 animated television special B.C.: The First Thanksgiving.

According to Ralph Bakshi, Banks arrived at his studio in 1973 asking for a job, despite telling him that she had no background in animation. She was given some small work in the 1974 feature Coonskin. After proving herself, Bakshi then assigned her to work on several of the background "goon" characters in the film Wizards whose animation quality was not high priority for the film as compared to the main characters. Her work was a complete success and Bakshi described her as the "star of the goons at the studio". From there, she went on to work on a number of Bakshi's subsequent features, including The Lord of the Rings in 1978 and Fire and Ice in 1983. After the latter film, Banks left the studio to instead begin work at Warner Brothers on their Looney Tunes television specials. She went on to work at other studios, including Hanna-Barbera for The Pirates of Dark Water and several episodes and games for Fox's Simpsons property. From 1997 to 2005, she was a dedicated layout animator for the King of the Hill television show, before disappearing from the animating field altogether.

Accolades and awards
Banks was given a WIA Diversity Award in 2018 by the Women in Animation non-profit due to her decades of work in the field of animation.

Personal life
Frequently described by her colleagues as a private and shy person who did not offer much information about herself or her background, animator Lee Crowe remembered that she had no interest or desire to be remembered as one of the first black women in animation. The only personal detail recalled about her, as stated by Nancy Beiman, is that Banks had a physical disability in the form of requiring leg braces before surgery.

Filmography
 1972 Clerow Wilson and the Miracle of P.S. 14 (TV Movie) (animator)
 1973 B.C.: The First Thanksgiving (TV Special short) (assistant animator)
 1974 Clerow Wilson's Great Escape (TV Movie) (animator - as Brenda Lee Banks)
 1974 ABC Afterschool Specials (TV Series) (animator - 1 episode)
 1974 Coonskin (animator - uncredited)
 1975 The Hoober-Bloob Highway (TV Movie) (animator)
 1977 Wizards (animator)
 1978 The Lord of the Rings (key animator)
 1980 Pontoffel Pock and His Magic Piano (TV Movie) (animator)
 1980 Heathcliff (TV Series) (animator - 1980)
 1981 American Pop (animator)
 1982 Hey Good Lookin' (animator)
 1983 Fire and Ice (animator)
 1983 Daffy Duck's Movie: Fantastic Island (animator: bridging sequences)
 1984–1985 The Smurfs (TV Series) (animator - 50 episodes)
 1985 The 13 Ghosts of Scooby-Doo (TV Mini-Series) (animator - 13 episodes)
 1985–1986 Paw Paws (TV Series) (animator - 18 episodes)
 1988 The Night of the Living Duck (Short) (animator - as Brenda L. Banks)
 1988 Daffy Duck's Quackbusters (animator)
 1988 Bugs vs. Daffy: Battle of the Music Video Stars (TV Special short) (animator)
 1989 This Is America, Charlie Brown (TV Mini-Series) (animator - 1 episode)
 1989 Bugs Bunny's Wild World of Sports (TV Movie) (animator)
 1990 Jetsons: The Movie (animator)
 1990 Tiny Toon Adventures (TV Series short) (animator - 1 episode)
 1990 Midnight Patrol: Adventures in the Dream Zone (TV Series) (animator - 13 episodes)
 1990 Gravedale High (TV Series) (animator - 13 episodes)
 1990 Bill & Ted's Excellent Adventures (TV Series) (animator - 13 episodes)
 1991 The Pirates of Dark Water (TV Series) (animator - 2 episodes)
 1990–1991 The Adventures of Don Coyote and Sancho Panda (TV Series short) (animator - 26 episodes)
 1993 Once Upon A Forest (animator)
 1990–1993 Tom & Jerry Kids Show (TV Series) (animator - 2 episodes)
 1994 The Pagemaster (additional character animator)
 1997 The Simpsons: Virtual Springfield (Video Game) (animator) / (traditional animator)
 1998 The Simpsons (TV Series) (character layout artist - 2 episodes)
 1997–2006 King of the Hill (TV Series) (character layout artist - 28 episodes, 1997 - 2003) (animation layout artist - 12 episodes, 2002 - 2006) (layout artist - 2 episodes, 2003 - 2005)

References

External links

Animators from California
1948 births
2020 deaths
20th-century American women artists
African-American women artists
American women animators
Artists from Los Angeles
California Institute of the Arts alumni
20th-century African-American women
20th-century African-American people
20th-century African-American artists
21st-century African-American people
21st-century African-American women